Filipe Samuel Magaia (7 March 1937 – 10/11 October 1966) was a Mozambican politician, guerrilla leader and Secretary of Defense for the Mozambican FRELIMO organisation during the Mozambican War of Independence. After a number of years fighting, Magaia was assassinated by a Frelimo soldier in the employ of the Portuguese.

Magaia was born in Mocuba, in the Zambezia Province of Mozambique, the son of Samuel Guenguene Magaia, a health practitioner, and his wife Albinic Ana Perreira Magaia. During his years as commander of the FRELIMO forces, Magaia sought assistance from Algeria in training his men. He outlined the strategy of the guerrilla forces as one of the "gradual wearing down, morally, psychologically and materially, of the enemy forces, and of the entire machinery that sustained the colonisation of Mozambique". He commanded forces during the initial attacks at Xai Xai, and later in the provinces of Niassa and Tete, using groups of ten to fifteen soldiers in quick guerrilla raids, advancing south towards Meponda and Mandimba, linking to Tete with the aid of forces from the Republic of Malawi. Enjoying freedom to move in the countryside, Magaia was able to increase his attack forces to the size of 100 soldiers in some cases, however on 10 or 11 October 1966, on returning to Tanzania after inspecting the front lines, Magaia was shot dead by Lourenço Matola, a fellow FRELIMO guerrilla who was said to be in the employ of the Portuguese.

Notes

1937 births
1966 deaths
People from Zambezia Province
Mozambican independence activists
FRELIMO politicians
Assassinated Mozambican politicians
People murdered in Tanzania
Deaths by firearm in Tanzania
1966 murders in Africa
Murder in Tanzania